This is a list of the National Register of Historic Places listings in Snyder County, Pennsylvania.

This is intended to be a complete list of the properties and districts on the National Register of Historic Places in Snyder County, Pennsylvania, United States. The locations of National Register properties and districts for which the latitude and longitude coordinates are included below, may be seen in a map.

There are 8 properties and districts listed on the National Register in the county. Two sites are further designated as National Historic Landmarks and another is designated as a National Historic Site.

Current listings

|}

See also

 List of Pennsylvania state historical markers in Snyder County

References

 
Snyder County